Livi Michael, also known as Olivia Michael (15 March 1960, Manchester), is a British fiction writer who publishes children and adult novels.

Career 
Michael began writing poetry at the age of seven. She attended Tameside College of Technology; University of Leeds and completed her B.A (English) with first-class honours in 1989, and her PhD in 1993. Her career as a novelist started with her first novel, Under a Thin Moon in 1992. In addition to her writing, Michael also worked as a university lecturer teaching creative writing, and ran reading groups about women's fiction. She began writing novels for adults in 1992, before writing her first children's novel in 2002, called Frank and the Black Hamster of Narkiz. While Michael was in the process of writing her first novel, she continued her education and completed her doctorate in 1993 at the University of Leeds, where she earned a dissertation named "Towards a Theory of Working Class Writing: Lewis Grassic Gibbon's A Scots Quair in the Context of Earlier Working Class Fiction". Livi Michael completed her second novel while teaching english literature and creative writing part-time until 1998, at Manchester Metropolitan University, and proceeded to write her third novel as well. Her fourth novel was published in 2000. Michael continues teaching english literature and creative writing for the Department of Cultural Studies at Sheffield Hallam University and writing novels for children. In addition to teaching and writing, she also gives guest lectures, participates in writing workshops, and visit schools where she hosts reading groups and answers student's questions.

Writing influences 
One of the factors that influenced Michael's writing was her son's hamster named "Frank". She describes Frank as an "adventurous hamster, and something of an escapologist". Her writing influences also come from the fact that she was raised in a single-parent home by her mother; Michael herself was an unemployed single mother of two as well. She is aware of the effects of poverty on women as she is involved with women's organisations and community centres. These factors have led to her understanding of women and their lives on various levels. She highlights the world of poor and working-class women through the characters in her novels. She emphasises on the voice of her characters by writing in a limited third person which allows the reader "to hear [the character's] usually silenced voices".

Notable works

Under a Thin Moon (1992) 
Livi Michael's first novel, Under a Thin Moon (1992) is praised for its portrayal of the underprivileged and working class women. It depicts how the lives of four working class women are tied together because of their class and gender. The story is set up in Manchester council estate, during the period of British Conservative politician Margaret Thatcher. Political elements such as capitalism and patriarchy are prominent in the novel, and criticised for the impoverished state of these women. Each of these women struggle with poverty and unemployment, which leads to the development of their similar identities despite their differing circumstances.

Frank and the Black Hamster of Narkiz (2002) 
Frank and the Black Hamster of Narkiz (2002) is a novel for younger children. It is a story of a hamster named Frank, who is brave and courageous unlike the other hamsters who are gentle, timid and domesticated creatures. Frank has a mission and a motto – 'Courage!'. He escapes from his cage and undertakes an adventurous journey to meet the mystreious black hamster of Narkiz. After the success of the first novel, Michael went on to write a series of novels on Frank's adventures, and all the novels have been successful.

The Whispering Road (2005) 
Michael has also wrote books for the young adults; The Whispering Road (2005) is one of her popular works in this genre. The novel represents the real but dark issues such as death, disease and abandonment through the lives of siblings Joe and Anne. It begins with their escape from slavery of a cruel farmer, in the hope of finding their lost mother. However, Joe's immature behaviour results in their separation along the journey. His guilt and deep love for his sister compels him to find her again which generates readers interest and sympathy towards his character. Michael sustains a spirit of kindness and hope throughout to balance out the dark and disturbing elements of the novel. The amalgamation of accurate historical facts and the elements of fantasy is interesting and appeals to the young readers.

Awards and honors

Bibliography

Books for adults 
 2015 Succession, St. Martin's Press
  2000 Inheritance, Penguin
 1997 All the Dark Air, Secker & Warburg
 1994 Their Angel Reach, Secker & Warburg
 1992 Under a Thin Moon, Secker & Warburg

Books for older children 
 2012 Malkin Child, Foxtail
 2009 Faerie Heart, Puffin
 2005 The Whispering Road, Puffin
 2006 The Angel Stone, Puffin
 2008 Sky Wolves, Puffin

Books for younger children 
 2009 43 Bin Street
 2007 City of Dogs, Putnam
 2006 Seventeen Times as High as the Moon, Orchard
 2005 Frank and the New Narkiz, Puffin
 2004 Frank and the Flames of Truth, Puffin
 2003 Frank and the Chamber of Fear, Puffin
 2002 Frank and the Black Hamster of Narkiz, Puffin

See also

References

External links 
 
 
 
 

1960 births
Living people
English children's writers
English fantasy writers
People from Stalybridge
20th-century English novelists
21st-century British novelists
20th-century English women writers
21st-century English women writers
English women novelists
Women science fiction and fantasy writers
20th-century British short story writers
21st-century British short story writers